The List of University of Florida faculty and administrators contains people currently and formerly serving the University of Florida as professors, deans, or in other educational capacities.

Academic administrators

 Lise Abrams, chair of Linguistics and Cognitive Science at Pomona College
 Ruth H. Alexander, former Chair to the Physical Education Department at the University of Florida
 Orland K. Armstrong, founded the University of Florida School of Journalism and former member of the United States House of Representatives
 Sharon Wright Austin, Director of the African-American Studies Program at the University of Florida
 George Burgess, world-renowned shark expert; director of International Shark Attack File
 Roy C. Craven, founding director of the University Gallery and art professor
 David R. Colburn, professor of history and author
 Mark S. Gold, chairman of Department of Psychiatry and Distinguished Alumni Professor of University of Florida
 Bob Graham, former Florida Governor and U.S. Senator, founder of Bob Graham Center for Public Service
 Peter E. Hildebrand, director emeritus for the Institute of Food and Agricultural Sciences and professor
 Rudolf Kálmán, director at Center for Mathematical System Theory and mathematical system theorist, winner of IEEE Medal of Honor, and former graduate research professor
 Thomas Maren, founding father of the University of Florida College of Medicine, inventor of the drug Trusopt
 William McKeen, professor and chairman of Department of Journalism
 Jerald T. Milanich, anthropologist and archaeologist; curator of archaeology at the Florida Museum of Natural History
 Howard Odum, ecologist; started and directed Center for Environmental Policy at the University of Florida, founded the University's Center for Wetlands in 1973
 John Anderson Palmer, philosopher and chairman of Department of Philosophy
 Leland Patouillet, former director of the University of Florida Alumni Association
 Ernest C. Pollard, professor of physics and biophysics; research scholar
 Sam Proctor, American historian, and founder of the oral history program; first UF Historian and Archivist
 Sartaj Sahni, computer scientist and chairman of the CISE department
 Richard L. Shriner, medical director, Shands Vista Psychiatric Hospital
 David Steadman, curator of ornithology at the Florida Museum of Natural History
 Lee Sweeney, current director of the Myology Institute and professor with the University of Florida College of Medicine
 Martin Uman, leading authority on physics of lightning, director of the UF Lightning Research Laboratory
 Baba C. Vemuri, Director of Laboratory for Vision Graphics and Medical Imaging at University of Florida and professor
 Sarah Whiting, currently director at Princeton University School of Architecture

Presidents and Chancellors
 Stan Albrecht, former researcher for University of Florida College of Medicine, former president of Utah State University
 Kern Alexander, former president of Western Kentucky University and Murray State University
 Samuel A. Banks, former president of Dickinson College and the University of Richmond
 George F. Baughman, former president of New College of Florida, former vice president of business affairs for University of Florida
 Jimmy Cheek, former professor and Chancellor of the University of Tennessee
 Robert G. Frank, former president of the University of New Mexico
 Elizabeth Hoffman, American historian, former President of University of Colorado System, and provost of Iowa State University
 Karen Holbrook, biological scientist, former president of Ohio State University, current vice president of University of South Florida
 Thomas Lyle Martin Jr., former President of the Illinois Institute of Technology
 Robert Mautz, attorney, and former president of State University System of Florida
 Alan Merten, former dean of the College of Business, current president of George Mason University
 Gene Nichol, former law professor, former president of The College of William & Mary
 James L. Oblinger, food scientist, former Chancellor of North Carolina State University
 John H. Owen, former president of the University of North Georgia
 Harry M. Philpott, former president of Auburn University
 Eugene G. Sander, former president of the University of Arizona
 Sheldon Schuster, current president of the Keck Graduate Institute
 Wei Shyy, current president of the Hong Kong University of Science and Technology
 Betty Siegel, author, former president of University System of Georgia, former dean of academy affairs for continuing education
 Leonard Cheng, current president of Lingnan University (Hong Kong)

Provosts and Vice Presidents
 Douglas Barrett, professor of pediatrics, former vice president of J. Hillis Miller Health Science Center
 Betty Capaldi, former provost of Arizona State University and professor at University of Florida
 Joseph Glover, current provost and former dean of the University of Florida College of Liberal Arts and Sciences
 David Guzick, current vice President of J. Hillis Miller Health Science Center
 Gillian Small, current provost for Fairleigh Dickinson University

Deans
 Reza Abbaschian, Iranian/American engineer and former dean of the Bourns College of Engineering
 Joseph Abiodun Balogun, former Dean of the College of Health Sciences at Chicago State University
 Cammy Abernathy, current dean of the University of Florida College of Engineering
 Earl C. Arnold, academic administrator and former dean of the Vanderbilt University Law School
 Jay M. Bernhardt, current dean of the Moody College of Communication at the University of Texas
 Anthony Catanese, professor of architecture, former dean of College of Architecture, current president of Florida Institute of Technology
 Paul D'Anieri, former dean of University of Florida College of Liberal Arts and Sciences
 Teresa Dolan, current dean of University of Florida College of Dentistry
 Catherine Emihovich, former dean of University of Florida College of Education
 Glenn E. Good, current dean of the University of Florida College of Education
 Michael Good, former dean of University of Florida College of Medicine
 Robert Jerry, former dean of University of Florida Levin College of Law
 Dennis Jett, diplomat and academic; former dean of University of Florida International Center
 Pramod Khargonekar, former dean of University of Florida College of Engineering
 Bruce C. Kone, former dean of the University of Florida College of Medicine and professor of medicine at the University of Texas Health Science Center at Houston
 John Kraft, current dean of the Warrington College of Business Administration
 Ralph Lowenstein, former dean of the University of Florida College of Journalism and Communications
 Thomas Lyle Martin, Jr., former dean of University of Florida College of Engineering, former president of Illinois Institute of Technology
 Roderick McDavis, former dean of University of Florida College of Education, current president of Ohio University
 Diane McFarlin, current dean of the University of Florida College of Journalism and Communications
 Jon L. Mills, former dean of the Levin College of Law and speaker for the Florida House of Representatives
 Eileen Oliver, current interim dean of the University of Florida Division of Continuing Education
 Onye_P._Ozuzu, current dean of the University of Florida College of the Arts
 William Riffee, former dean of University of Florida College of Pharmacy
 Peter Henry Rolfs, agronomist, former dean of College of Agriculture and Life Sciences
 Judith Russell, current dean of University of Florida Library System
 Andrew P. Sage, former dean of the School of Information Technology and Engineering of the George Mason University
 Gillian Small, biologist, current dean of research at the City University of New York
 Dennis K. Stanley, former dean of the University of Florida College of Health and Human Performance
 Neil Sullivan, current professor of physics, former dean of University of Florida College of Liberal Arts and Sciences
 Blake Ragsdale Van Leer, former Dean of Engineering at University of Florida and president of Georgia Tech
 Sarah Whiting, current dean of the Rice University School of Architecture

Athletic Directors
 Alfred Buser, 1917–1920
 William Kline, 1920–1923
 James White, 1923–1925
 Everett Yon, 1925–1928
 Charlie Bachman, 1928–1930
 Edgar Jones, 1930–1936
 Josh Cody, 1936–1939
 Tom Lieb, 1940–1945
 Raymond Wolf, 1946–1949
 Bob Woodruff, 1950–1959
 Ray Graves, 1960–1979
 Bill Carr, 1979–1986
 Bill Arnsparger, 1986–1992
 Jeremy Foley, 1992–2016
 Scott Stricklin, 2016–present

Distinguished Professors

 Barry Ache, Distinguished Professor of Biology and Neuroscience at the Whitney Laboratory for Marine Bioscience
 Alan Agresti, Distinguished Professor of Statistics
 Kenneth Berns, Distinguished Professor of Molecular Genetics and Microbiology
 George Casella, former Distinguished Professor in the Department of Statistics at the University of Florida
 George Christou, currently the Drago and Distinguished Professor at the University of Florida
 Hartmut Derendorf, Distinguished professor of Pharmaceutical Sciences 
 Roger Fillingim, Distinguished Professor and psychologist
 Malay Ghosh, Distinguished Professor and Indian statistician
 Jeff Gill, Distinguished Professor of Government
 Mark S. Gold, Distinguished Professor and Chairman, Department of Psychiatry
 Raphael Haftka, Distinguished Professor of Engineering
 Arthur F Hebard, Distinguished Professor of Physics
 Peter Hirschfeld, Distinguished Professor of Physics
 Brian Iwata, Distinguished Professor of Psychology
 Walter Stephen Judd, Distinguished Professor of Botany
 John R. Klauder, Distinguished Professor, Physics and Math, Department of Physics
 Louis J. Lanzerotti, Distinguished Professor of Physics
 Mark Law, Distinguished Professor of Engineering
 Phil Lounibos, Distinguished Professor of Entomology
 Charles R. Martin, Distinguished Professor of Chemistry
 Bruce MacFadden, Distinguished Professor of Paleontology
 Guenakh Mitselmakher, Distinguished Professor of Physics
 Leonid Moroz, Distinguished Professor of Neuroscience
 Brij Moudgil, Distinguished Professor of Material Science
 P. K. Ramachandran Nair, Distinguished Professor of Agroforestry and International Forestry
 Mark Orazem, Distinguished Professor of Engineering
 Panos M. Pardalos, Distinguished Professor of Engineering
 Stephen Pearton, Distinguished Professor of Engineering and Material Science
 Scott Powers, Distinguished Professor of Psychology
 Jose Principe, Distinguished Professor of Biomedical Engineering
 Ann Progulske-Fox, Distinguished Professor of Dentistry and Program Director
 Pierre Ramond, Distinguished Professor of Physics
 Fan Ren, Distinguished Professor of Engineering
 Sartaj Sahni, Distinguished Professor of Computer Science
 Kirk Schanze, Distinguished Professor of Chemistry
 Pierre Sikivie, Distinguished Professor of Physics
 Paul Sindelar, Distinguished Professor of Education
 Douglas E. Soltis, Distinguished Professor with the Florida Museum of Natural History
 Pamela S. Soltis, Distinguished Professor with the Florida Museum of Natural History
 Weihong Tan, Distinguished Professor of Chemistry
 David B. Tanner, Distinguished Professor of Physics
 Leslie Thiele, Distinguished Professor of Political Science
 Martin A. Uman, Distinguished Professor of Engineering
 Clifford Martin Will, Distinguished Professor, Department of Physics

Professors and faculty

 

A
 Richard Adams, English novelist
 Sean Adams, historian who specializes in the history of American capitalism and energy
 Kole Ade-Odutola, poet
 Mavis Agbandje-McKenna, medical biophysicist, structural virologist, and a professor of structural biology
 Ravindra K. Ahuja, computer scientist
 Ronald Akers, criminologist and professor emeritus of criminology and law
 John Algeo, former assistant dean of the graduate school and professor of English
 Krishnaswami Alladi, Indian-American mathematician who specializes in number theory
 Warder Clyde Allee, zoologist
 Ida Altman, historian of colonial Spain and Latin America
 Dominick Angiolillo, Italian cardiologist
 Lisa Anthony, computer scientist
 Susan C. Antón, biological anthropologist and paleoanthropologist
 George J. Armelagos, anthropologist, and Goodrich C. White Professor of Anthropology at Emory University
 Donald Ault, Professor of English at the University of Florida
 James H. Austin, neurologist and author
B
 Stanley Ballard, physicist specializing in optics
 Aida Bamia, professor of Arabic language and literature
 Turpin Bannister, architectural historian
 Barbara Barletta, classical archaeologist and architectural historian
 Rodney J. Bartlett, Professor of Chemistry and Physics
 Linda Bartoshuk, Presidential Endowed Professor of Community Dentistry and Behavioral Sciences
 Merle Battiste, chemist and emeritus Professor of Chemistry at the University of Florida
 Fuller Bazer, animal scientist and Regents Fellow
 Robert de Beaugrande, Professor of English Linguistics
 Leonard Beeghley, sociologist
 Cynthia D. Belar, clinical psychologist
 Steven Albert Benner, molecular biologist
 Suresh Kumar Bhatia, chemical engineer, academic, Shanti Swarup Bhatnagar laureate
 Thomas S. Bianchi, oceanographer and biogeochemist
 Buster Bishop, physical education professor and coach for the Florida Gators men's golf team
 Karen Bjorndal, biologist
 Meredith Blackwell, mycologist
 David Boger, Australian chemical engineer
 Miklós Bóna, mathematician
 Camille Bordas, French writer
 H. Jane Brockmann, biologist and fellow of the American Association for the Advancement of Science
 James Broselow, Clinical Associate Professor of Emergency Medicine in the Department of Emergency Medicine at the University of Florida College of Medicine
 Babette Brumback, biostatistician known for her work on causal inference
 W. Fitzhugh Brundage, historian
 Stuart Buchanan, voice actor, announcer, and educator
 George H. Burgess, ichthyologist and fisheries biologist with the Florida Museum of Natural History
 Robert Burne, microbiologist
 David Bushell, Latin American historian, one of the first Americans to study Colombia
C
 Robert Cade, co-inventor of Gatorade
 William Calin, senior scholar of Medieval French literature and French Poetry at the University of Florida
 Clay Calvert, mass communications scholar
 Pierre Capretz, Professor of French
 Archie Carr, zoologist, conservationist, and founder of the Caribbean Conservation Corporation 
 Gwendolen M. Carter, Canadian-American political scientist
 Jean C. Chance, Professor of Journalism
 Colin Chapman, professor and Canada Research Chair in Primate Ecology and Conservation at McGill University
 Shigang Chen, Fellow of the Institute of Electrical and Electronics Engineers
 Paul Chun, professor of thermodynamics
 John Ciardi, etymologist 
 Jill Ciment, writer and Guggenheim Fellow
 Ronald A. Cohen, neuropsychologist and Evelyn F. McKnight chair for clinical translational research in cognitive aging and memory 
 Theo Colborn, zoologist and environmental health analyst
 Suzy Covey, comics scholar and former university librarian emerita
 Patricia Craddock, author and professor of English
 Harry Crews, novelist
 Florin Curta, Romanian historian, medievalist and archaeologist on Eastern Europe
D
 Robert Dana, poet
 Radhika Ramana Dasa, Vaishnava scholar
 Susmita Datta, professor of biostatistics at the University of Florida
 Manning J. Dauer, political scientist, developed the 1967 reapportionment plan for Florida
 Paul W. Davenport, physiologist
 Jack E. Davis, environmental history and sustainability studies professor
 Martha Ellen Davis, anthropologist and ethnomusicologist
 Kathleen A. Deagan, archaeologist 
 George R. Dekle Sr., Legal Skills Professor at the Levin College of Law
 Steven T. DeKosky, medical researcher and academic known for his work in the field of Alzheimer's disease
 Joel S. Demski, accounting researcher and educator
 Michael J. S. Dewar, Indian theoretical chemist
 Nils J. Diaz, former Chairman of the Nuclear Regulatory Commission
 James Dickey, novelist
 Lawrence Dodd, political scientist and Manning J. Dauer Eminent Scholar in Political Science 
 Ngô Đồng, entomologist and nematologist
 Herbert Grove Dorsey, engineer, inventor and physicist
 Jane Douglas, Professor of Management Communication
 Russell S. Drago, professor of inorganic chemistry
 Lester Dragstedt, surgeon and professor
 Alexander Dranishnikov, Russian-American mathematician
 Daniel C. Drucker, mechanical engineer, known for contributions to the theory of plasticity
 Stewart Duncan, philosopher known for contributions on philosophy of Thomas Hobbes
 Andrea Dutton, geologist
 Boaz Dvir, Israeli-American professor, journalist, and filmmaker
E
 Jonathan F. Earle, Professor of Engineering
 William F. Enneking, orthopaedic oncologist
 Georg Essl, Austrian Computer Scientist and Musician
F
 Albert Fathi, Egyptian-French mathematician
 Joe Feagin, sociologist and social theorist 
 Mark Fenster, attorney and professor with the Levin College of Law
 Mark Flannery, economist
 Kevin Folta, professor and chairman of the horticultural sciences department at the University of Florida
 David J. Foulis, mathematician 
G
 Robert B. Gaither,  mechanical engineer, professor and chairman of the Department of Mechanical Engineering at the University of Florida College of Engineering
 Thomas Gallant, historian who specializes in modern Greek history and archaeology
 J. Matthew Gallman, educator and author of books about nineteenth-century history
 Michael Gannon, historian, former priest and author
 Jeremy Gardiner, contemporary British landscape painter 
 Frank Garvan, Australian-born mathematician who specializes in number theory and combinatorics
 Robert Franklin Gates, muralist, painter, and art professor
 Patrick J. Geary, medieval historian
 Alan Dale George, Fellow of the Institute of Electrical and Electronics Engineers
 Susan D. Gillespie, anthropologist and archaeologist
 Mark S. Gold, researcher and author
 Maureen Goodenow, scientist and Professor of Pathology, Immunology, and Laboratory Medicine
 Malcolm Grant, former professor and current President of University College London
 Debora Greger, poet and visual artist
 David Grove, anthropologist, archaeologist, and academic
 Jaber F. Gubrium, sociologist
Lillian Guerra, Professor of History and widely published author and speaker
 Louis J. Guillette Jr, former professor of embryology
H
 R. M. Hare, English moral philosopher
 Mike Haridopolos, faculty member at the Bob Graham Center for Public Service
 Willis Harman, social scientist and futurist
 Marvin Harris, anthropologist
 Molly Harrower, South African clinical psychologist
 Melissa Hart, actress, singer, and teacher
 Todd Hasak-Lowy, formerly an Associate Professor of Hebrew Literature at the University of Florida
 Kenneth Heilman, behavioral neurologist
 Sumi Helal, computer scientist
 Seymour Hess, meteorologist and planetary scientist
 So Hirata, Professor of Chemistry, received the Annual Medal of the International Academy of Quantum Molecular Science
 Horton H. Hobbs, Jr., carcinologist
 David A. Hodell, geologist
 Michael Hofmann, German poet
 Norman N. Holland, former literary critic and Marston-Milbauer Eminent Scholar Emeritus at the University of Florida
 Noy Holland, writer
 C. S. Holling, Canadian ecologist and winner of the Volvo Environment Prize
 Aparna V. Huzurbazar, statistician 
I
 Lonnie Ingram, microbiologist and Fellow of the American Academy of Microbiology and Society of Industrial Microbiology
J
 Suzanne Bennett Johnson, psychologist and a past president of the American Psychological Association
 Donald Justice, poet and Pulitzer Prize winner
K
 Lynda Lee Kaid, former Telecommunications and Research Foundation Professor in the College of Journalism and Communications
 Rudolf E. Kálmán, Hungarian-born American electrical engineer, mathematician, and inventor
 Henry Kandrup, astrophysicist and professor at the University of Florida
 John Kaplan, photographer and Pulitzer Prize winner
 Akito Y. Kawahara, American and Japanese entomologist, scientist, and advocate of nature education
 Ken Kerslake, archivist and Distinguished Service Professor Emeritus for the University of Florida
 Solon Kimball, anthropologist
 Elmer E. Kirkpatrick, former Assistant Professor in the College of Architecture at the University of Florida
 Karen Koch, plant biologist in the horticultural science department in the University of Florida
 Marvin Krohn, criminologist
 G. Pradeep Kumar, cell biologist and a scientist 
L
 Elizabeth Lada, Professor of Astronomy at the University of Florida
 Louis J. Lanzerotti, Professor of Physics
 Jean A. Larson, mathematician; professor at the University of Florida
 Robert Lawless, cultural anthropologist
 David Leavitt, novelist and Professor of English
 David Lee, winner of the Nobel Prize in 1996, and Professor
 René Lemarchand, French political scientist
 Tracy R. Lewis, professor of economics
 Bernard J. Liska, food scientist
 William Logan, poet, critic, and scholar
 Ira Longini, biostatistician and infectious disease epidemiologist
 Prakash Loungani, macroeconomist
 Per-Olov Löwdin, Swedish physicist
 Andrew Nelson Lytle, Professor of Literature; helped start the Masters of Fine Arts program at UF
M
 Neill W. Macaulay Jr., writer and professor
 Murdo J. MacLeod, Scottish historian of Latin America
 G. S. Maddala, Indian-American economist and mathematician
 John K. Mahon, historian
 William R. Maples, forensic anthropologist; worked with the Florida Museum of Natural History
 Maxine Margolis, anthropologist; American Academy of Arts and Sciences inductee
 A. H. de Oliveira Marques, Portuguese historian
 Fletcher Martin, painter
 William Clifford Massey, anthropologist
 Walter Mauderli, Swiss professor of Medical physics
 Lisa McElwee-White, Colonel Allen R. and Margaret G. Crow Professor of Chemistry at the University of Florida
 Robert McMahon, international relations expert 
 William McRae, lawyer and judge for the United States District Court for the Middle District of Florida
 Kenneth Megill, philosopher, trade unionist, social activist, records and knowledge manager
 Jawahar L. Mehta, former Professor of Medicine
 John H. Moore, anthropologist and former Chair of the Anthropology Department 
 Jacques Morcos, neurologist and fellow with the University of Florida
 Charles W. Morris, semiotician and philosopher
 Michael Moseley, anthropologist
 William Murrill, mycologist
N
 Vasudha Narayanan, scholar of Hinduism at University of Florida and former President of the American Academy of Religion
 Charles Nelson, legal scholar and former U.S. Representative from Maine
 Wilmon Newell, entomologist
 Wayne Nicholson, biologist
O
 Howard T. Odum, ecologist
 Neil D. Opdyke, Distinguished Professor Emeritus in the Department of Geological Sciences at the University of Florida 
 Ants Oras, Estonian translator and writer
 Paul Ortiz, historian
 Harry Ostrer, geneticist
P
 John Anderson Palmer, philosopher and professor of philosophy at the University of Florida and awarded a Guggenheim Fellowship
 Alfred Browning Parker, Modernist architect
 Karen F. Parker, sociologist and criminologist known for her research on urban violence
 Rembert W. Patrick, historian, longtime University of Florida history professor, and author 
 Simon Penny, professor in the field of interactive art
 Michael Perfit, geologist
 Anna L. Peterson, scholar of religious studies
 Nicole Leeper Piquero, criminologist
 S. Jay Plager, professor with the Levin College of Law and judge with the United States Court of Appeals for the Federal Circuit
 Philip Podsakoff, professor of management
 Ernest C. Pollard, professor of physics and biophysics and an author
 Frank Moya Pons, leading contemporary historian on the Dominican Republic
 Padgett Powell, novelist
 Frank W. Putnam, biologist and author
R
 Michael L. Radelet, sociologist
 Anil K. Rajvanshi, Indian engineer
 Subramaniam Ramakrishnan, Indian polymer chemist
 Marjorie Kinnan Rawlings, writer, Pulitzer Prize winner for the novel The Yearling
 George Alan Rekers, psychologist and ordained Southern Baptist minister
 David Reitze, professor of physics
 Mary Robison, short-story writer and novelist
 Yuli Rudyak, professor of mathematics
 Katheryn Russell-Brown, legal scholar
 Darrett B. Rutman, historian
S
 Kevin Sabet, assistant professor in the Department of Psychiatry at the University of Florida
 Helen Safa, anthropologist, feminist scholar and academic
 Chih-Tang Sah, Professor of Physics, and Professor of Electrical and Computer Engineering
 Robert Satcher, physician, chemical engineer, NASA astronaut, and fellow with the University of Florida College of Medicine
 Paul Satz, psychologist, and one of the founders of the discipline neuropsychology
 Lawrence Scarpa, architect, educator, leader in sustainable design
 John Schrieffer, physicist, Nobel Prize winner
 Samuel Sears, psychologist
 Zachary Selden, former Deputy Secretary-General of the NATO Parliamentary Assembly; Associate Professor of international relations
 Leland Shanor, mycologist and botanist
 Wei Shyy, Professor of Aerospace Engineering
 Gwendolyn Zoharah Simmons, religious scholar
 Robert Singerman, Judaica bibliographer; held the position of University Librarian at the George A. Smathers Libraries where he was the bibliographer for Jewish Studies, Anthropology, and Linguistics
 John C. Slater, physicist; made major contributions to the theory of the electronic structure of atoms, molecules and solids
 Laura Sjoberg, international affairs scholar
 Benjamin Smith, political scientist
 Ottón Solís, scholar of Latin American studies
 Alexander Stephan, specialist in German literature and area studies
 Evon Streetman, faculty with the Samuel P. Harn Museum of Art
 Neil Sullivan, Professor of Physics
T
 Bron Taylor, scholar and conservationist
 Mark Tehranipoor, researcher specializing in hardware security
 Henri Theil, Dutch econometrician
 Michael C. Thomas, entomologist and writer; works for the Florida Department of Agriculture and Consumer Services as a Taxonomic Entomologist, Entomology Section Administrator, and curator of Coleoptera and Orthoptera
 John G. Thompson, mathematician, Abel Prize and Fields Medal winner
 Charles Thorn, Professor of Physics
 Jalie Tucker, Professor of Clinical Psychology
 James B. Twitchell, author and former professor of English
U
 Jerry Uelsmann, photographer
 Stanislaw Ulam, Polish mathematician
 Gregory Ulmer, Professor of English at the University of Florida
V
 James Van Fleet, Commander for the University of Florida ROTC Program, commanding General of U.S. Army and other United Nations forces during the Korean War
 Carl Van Ness, University of Florida historian and archivist
 Gonda Van Steen, Cassas Chair in Greek Studies 
 Manuel Vasquez, Professor of Latin American studies
 Johannes Vieweg, Professor of Urology, Eminent Scholar Chair, College of Medicine
 Harald von Boehmer, German immunologist
W
 Sidney Wade, poet
 Alexander Wagenaar, professor of health outcomes and policy at the University of Florida College of Medicine
 Michael Warren, forensic anthropologist
 Count Albert Wass, Hungarian Professor of Literature and History
 James L. Wattenbarger, Professor of Education, and Father of the Community College System of Florida
 Rudolph Weaver, first professor of architecture, first dean of architecture, second architect for Florida Board of Control
 Wilse B. Webb, psychologist and sleep researcher
 Phillip E. Wegner, Marston-Milbauer Eminent Scholar in English at the University of Florida
 Colin Welford, Professor of Music, conductor
 John Daniel Wild, philosopher
 Hiram D. Williams, painter and professor of art at the University of Florida
 Joy Williams, author
 Lakiesha Williams, Associate Professor in Biomedical Engineering
 Kate Vixon Wofford, educator and elected official
 William Woodruff, British Historian of World History
 Donald E. Worcester, American historian who specialized in Southwestern United States and Latin American history
 Bertram Wyatt-Brown, historian of the Southern United States
Y
 Linda J. Young, Chief Mathematical Statistician at the National Agricultural Statistics Service
Z
 Miriam Zach, musicologist
 Michael Zerner, physicist
 Robert Zieger, labor historian

See also
 List of University of Florida alumni
 List of University of Florida presidents

 
Faculty
Lists of people by university or college in Florida